The Syrian Free Army, also known as the Army of Free Syria or the Free Syria Army, known as the Army of the Commandos of the Revolution (Jaysh Maghawir al-Thawra, abbreviated MaT) from December 2016 to October 2022 and the New Syrian Army (Jaysh Suriya al-Jadid, abbreviated NSA or NSyA), from May 2015 to December 2016, is a Syrian Opposition group which controls territory near the Syrian-Jordanian border. The group is most commonly referred to as the Maghaweir al-Thowra, a transliteration of its former name.  Founded as an expansion of the Allahu Akbar Brigade by Syrian Arab Army defectors and other rebels during the Syrian Civil War on 20 May 2015, the New Syrian Army sought to expel the Islamic State from southeastern Syria. In December 2016, the New Syrian Army dissolved, and the remnants of the group formed Maghawir al-Thawra.  In 2022 it rebranded as the Syrian Free Army following disputes between different factions of its leadership.

Operational history

New Syrian Army

The New Syrian Army was established by remnants of the Allahu Akbar Brigade, part of the Authenticity and Development Front and formerly based in Abu Kamal. The NSA was formed on 20 May 2015, and its fighters were trained in Jordan.

On 16 November 2015, the New Syrian Army was deployed at al-Tanf in southeastern Syria, near Iraq and Jordan, and carried out a raid, with or without US aerial support. No further information was given.

On 5 March 2016, the NSA and another FSA group, the Forces of Martyr Ahmad al-Abdo, captured the al-Tanf border crossing from ISIL in a cross-border raid from Jordan.

In May 2016, an Islamic State suicide attack struck an NSA base near al-Tanf, which resulted in a large number of casualties. The attack brought to the surface underlying tensions and a lack of morale within the group, whose members alleged that the US failed to provide them with the equipment promised.

In June 2016, the NSA's base near al-Tanf was hit by multiple cluster bombs from Russian airstrikes, killing 2 and injuring 18. Russia denied responsibility for the airstrike, although photos released by the NSA identified the bombs as Russian RBK-500 cluster bombs which were delivered from Khmeimim Air Base in Latakia.

Later in June, the group launched an offensive against ISIL in Abu Kamal. The offensive was repelled by ISIL.

On 3 August 2016, the New Syrian Army was expelled from the Authenticity and Development Front.

Ghosts of the Desert
The Ghosts of the Desert was an NSA-affiliated anti-ISIL insurgent group that covertly operated in ISIL-held towns in southeastern Syria and southwestern Iraq such as Abu Kamal, Mayadin, and al-Qaim. Since March 2016, they initially sprayed graffiti and raised Syrian and Iraqi flags in the towns, but began to conduct covert military activities the next month, such as sabotage, assassinations of ISIL fighters, and marking positions for airstrikes. The group supplied military intelligence to the US Air Force that allowed them to kill Abu Waheeb in May 2016 in the Iraqi town of Rutbah after the group marked his location.

Revolutionary Commando Army

In December 2016, the New Syrian Army dissolved after internal disputes. Some of its remnants regrouped under the name of the Maghawir al-Thawra (Commandos of the Revolution), led by Captain Abdullah al-Zoubi.

On 30 April 2017, the Maghawir al-Thawra launched an offensive into eastern Syria, reaching the Deir ez-Zor Governorate and capturing the village of Humaymah, south of the T2 pumping station. Two days later, the rebels attacked and captured several sites in the region, including: Tarwazeh al-Wa`er, Sereit al-Wa`er, Mount Ghrab, Swab desert, al-Kamm Swab, the T3 Pumping Station, Me`izeileh and Tarwazeh al-Attshaneh. On 6 May, FSA groups including the MaT captured several sites in the Badiya region of Homs Governorate to the south of Palmyra including Dahlouz and al-Halbeh areas. The MaT was supplied with IAG Guardian armoured personnel carriers by the US during the operation.

In late November 2017, at least 180 fighters in the Maghawir al-Thawra were relieved of duty. According to the United States Central Command, the fighters "completed their military service", while according to the group's spokesman, they were removed due to their "weak performance". As result, between 40 and 60 fighters were left in the group. The unit increased in numbers after that point, with  300 fighters serving with the Maghawir al-Thawra by October 2018.

In 2021, reports emerged that several explosions took place in al-Tanf.  The Maghawair al-Thawra stated that they came from training exercises that it was conducting in the region.  On 20 October 2021, the Maghaweir al-Thawra, other Opposition elements at al-Tanf, and the US garrison there were attacked by drones, causing no injuries.

Syrian Free Army

On 23 September 2022, the US-led coalition dismissed Maghawir al-Thawra's commander Brigadier General Muhannad Ahmad al-Tala and replaced him with Captain Muhammad Farid al-Qassem, a former leader of the Qaryatayn Martyrs' Brigade.  This caused a group of MaT leaders styling themselves as the military council of MaT to reject the new leader and seize control of part of the al-Tanf base, leading to a brief siege in which the military council was confronted by the main MaT group and US forces, submitting to the new leadership soon after. Following another meeting with US forces, the group changed its name to the Syrian Free Army on 23 October.

See also
 List of armed groups in the Syrian Civil War
 Division 30 - Another Syrian paramilitary group trained and equipped by the United States-led Coalition.
 The White Shroud

References

Free Syrian Army
Military units and factions of the Syrian civil war
Anti-ISIL factions in Syria
Rebel groups that actively control territory